Degole Parish is an administrative unit of Tukums Municipality, Latvia. Prior to the 2009 administrative reforms it was part of Tukums District.

Towns, villages and settlements of Degole Parish

References 

Parishes of Latvia
Tukums Municipality
Courland